The 2004 Chase for the Nextel Cup served as the premiere ten-race playoff series among the top ten drivers in the NASCAR Nextel Cup Series. After the Chevy Rock and Roll 400 on September 11, 2004, the ten drivers atop the standings were locked into the playoff. Kurt Busch won the driver's championship for the first time in his career.

Participants
 Jeff Gordon — Hendrick Motorsports No. 24 (Rick Hendrick) 5050
 Jimmie Johnson — Hendrick Motorsports No. 48 (Jeff Gordon 1) -5
 Dale Earnhardt Jr. — Dale Earnhardt, Inc. No. 8 (Teresa Earnhardt) -10
 Tony Stewart — Joe Gibbs Racing No. 20 (Joe Gibbs) -15
 Matt Kenseth — Roush Racing No. 17 (Mark Martin 2) -20
 Elliott Sadler — Robert Yates Racing No. 38 (Robert Yates) -25
 Kurt Busch — Roush Racing No. 97 (Georgetta Roush 3) -30
 Mark Martin — Roush Racing No. 6 (Jack Roush) -35
 Jeremy Mayfield — Evernham Motorsports No. 19 (Ray Evernham) -40
 Ryan Newman — Penske Racing No. 12 (Roger Penske) -45

Final standings
 Kurt Busch – 6506
 Jimmie Johnson – 6498
 Jeff Gordon – 6490
 Mark Martin – 6399
 Dale Earnhardt Jr. – 6368
 Tony Stewart – 6326
 Ryan Newman – 6180
 Matt Kenseth – 6069
 Elliott Sadler – 6024
 Jeremy Mayfield – 6000

Notes

1 – Jeff Gordon is the official owner of the No. 48, though his work in signing Johnson to Hendrick Motorsports, licensing of merchandising through Hendrick Gordon Licensing LLC, and holds minority interest in the team.

2 – Mark Martin is the official owner of the No. 17 because of his work in signing Kenseth, and holds minority interest in that team.

3 – Georgetta Roush is Jack's mother, and the official owner of the No. 97.

References

Chase for the Nextel Cup